Chromophobia is an ensemble film which debuted at the 2005 Cannes Film Festival in France. The film's crew was made up of a brother-sister trio – Martha Fiennes wrote and directed the film, Ralph Fiennes starred in it, and Magnus Fiennes composed the score. The film was shot entirely in Great Britain and the Isle of Man.

Plot

Chromophobia takes a look at several people and relationships. Some of these people are very wealthy and have become so obsessed with their wealth and material objects they are very detached from more important things in life. The things they choose to reject in their pursuit for the finer things in life include friendship, their children, love and integrity. At one point or another in the movie, each character begins to realize and then face their problems and in a sense their lives come crashing down. The characters then begin to see if they can get their lives back and carry on with a new look.

Cast
Penélope Cruz as Gloria
Ralph Fiennes as Stephen Tulloch
Kristin Scott Thomas as Iona Aylesbury
Rhys Ifans as Colin
Ian Holm as Edward Aylesbury
Damian Lewis as Marcus Aylesbury
Ben Chaplin as Trent
Michelle Gomez as Bushey (incorrectly credited as 'Michele Gormez')
Robbie Gee as Ricky

References

External links 
 
 

2005 films
2005 drama films
British drama films
Films directed by Martha Fiennes
Films set in London
Films shot in the Isle of Man
2000s English-language films
2000s British films